A Discord Electric is the fifth album from Danish metal band Raunchy.

Reception

Track listing

Personnel 
 Kasper Thomsen – Vocals
 Jesper Tilsted – Guitars
 Lars Christensen – Guitars
 Jeppe Christensen – Keyboards, clean vocals, lead vocals on "Dim the Lights and Run"
 Jesper Kvist – Bass
 Morten Toft Hansen – Drums

References 

Raunchy (band) albums
2010 albums